Jay Cook Budd (December 4, 1865 - August 22, 1923) was a professional baseball player. He played one game as a left fielder in Major League Baseball in 1890 for the Cleveland Infants of the short-lived Players' League.

References

 SABR research newsletter, May 2009

Major League Baseball left fielders
Cleveland Infants players
Baseball players from Ohio
1865 births
1923 deaths
19th-century baseball players